"Wildflowers" is a popular song by Tom Petty and the opening track from the album of the same name. The song became quite popular in concerts, and though it was not released as a single, it charted at #16 on the Billboard Hot Rock Songs chart, at #11 on the Billboard Rock Digital Song Sales and at #3 on the Billboard Lyric Find. AllMusic describes it as having a simple but effective folk-based chord progression, with a sprightly, almost country-oriented rhythm.

The song has gone on to become one of the most beloved in Petty's catalog. Petty also stated "Wildflowers" was easy to write and compose. It was one of the non-singles which were included on the compilation The Best of Everything (others were "Southern Accents", "Square One", "Angel Dream" and "Dreamville").

On August 20, 2020, a posthumous release of the home recorded demo version of the song was released as a digital single alongside a music video. The video contains never-before-seen footage shot by Martyn Atkins during the recording of "Wildflowers". On the same day, it was officially announced that on October 16, a posthumous album titled Wildflowers & All the Rest would be released. It is a comprehensive re-release of "Wildflowers" including the home version (released as a single in August) along with the album Wildflowers and many unearthed gems and demos/home recordings.

The title of the November 2020 book Somewhere You Feel Free: Tom Petty and Los Angeles comes from a lyric in the song.

"Wildflowers" is also Tom Petty's fourth most streamed solo song (and seventh overall) on Spotify, even surpassing the same album's big hit "You Don't Know How it Feels".

Composition
Petty described writing "Wildflowers":

References

1994 songs
Tom Petty songs
Songs written by Tom Petty
Warner Records singles